Igor Julio dos Santos de Paulo (born 7 February 1998), known as Igor Julio or simply Igor, is a Brazilian professional footballer who plays as a central defender for Italian Serie A club Fiorentina.

Club career
Born in Bom Sucesso, Minas Gerais, Igor joined Red Bull Brasil's youth setup from Portuguesa Santista. In July 2016, after impressing with the under-20 side, he moved abroad and joined Austrian Bundesliga side FC Red Bull Salzburg, being initially assigned to the reserve team.

Igor made his professional debut for Liefering on 22 July 2016, starting in a 1–0 Austrian Football First League home win against SV Horn. After being a regular starter, he made his first team debut the following 28 May, playing the full 90 minutes in a 1–0 home defeat of SC Rheindorf Altach.

Igor was promoted to Red Bull Salzburg's main squad on 26 May 2017, but continued to appear mainly with the B-team. On 7 January 2018, he was loaned to fellow top tier club Wolfsberger AC, until June.

On 2 July 2018, Igor moved to FK Austria Wien also in the first division, on a season-long loan deal.

On 26 June 2019, Igor signed to Italian Serie A club SPAL a contract until 2023.

On 31 January 2020, Igor joined Fiorentina on a two-year loan with an obligation to buy.

Career statistics

References

External links

 Profile at the ACF Fiorentina website 
 

1998 births
Living people
Sportspeople from Minas Gerais
Brazilian footballers
Association football defenders
FC Liefering players
FC Red Bull Salzburg players
Wolfsberger AC players
FK Austria Wien players
S.P.A.L. players
ACF Fiorentina players
Austrian Football Bundesliga players
2. Liga (Austria) players
Serie A players
Brazilian expatriate footballers
Brazilian expatriate sportspeople in Austria
Brazilian expatriate sportspeople in Italy
Expatriate footballers in Austria
Expatriate footballers in Italy